Al-Fadl, also spelled Al-Fazl and in other ways, is an Arabic term meaning the bounty. It is used as a male given name and, in modern usage, a surname. It may refer to:

Given name
Al-Fadl ibn Salih (740–789), Abbasid governor in Syria and Egypt
Al-Fadl ibn Rawh ibn Hatim al-Muhallabi (died 794), provincial governor for the Abbasid Caliphate
Al-Fadl ibn al-Rabi' (757/8–823/4), chamberlain and vizier of the Abbasid caliphs Harun al-Rashid and al-Amin
Al-Fadl ibn Yahya (766–808), one of the Barmakids, governor in the Abbasid Caliphate under Harun al-Rashid
Al-Fadl ibn Naubakht (8th century), Persian scholar at the court of the Caliph Harun al-Rashid
Al-Fadl ibn Sahl (died 818), vizier of the Abbasid caliph al-Ma'mun
Al-Fadl ibn Marwan (ca. 774–864), Christian vizier of the Abbasid caliph al-Mu'tasim
Fadl ibn Rabi'ah (ca. 1107), Bedouin emir, progenitor of the Al Fadl dynasty
Fadl ibn Isa (13th century), Al Fadl ruler under the Mamluks

Surname
Jamal al-Fadl (born 1963), Sudanese Islamic militant
Amer Al Fadhel (born 1988), Kuwaiti footballer

Other
Al Fadl, an Arab dynasty that ruled parts of Syria on behalf of various Muslim states
Al Fazl (newspaper), regular publication of the Ahmadiyya Muslim Community

See also
Abu'l-Fadl